
Dvesha (Sanskrit: द्वेष, IAST: dveṣa; Pali: दोस, dosa; Tibetan: zhe sdang) is a Buddhist and Hindu term that is translated as "hate, aversion". In Hinduism, it is one of the Five Poisons or kleshas. 

In Buddhism, Dvesha (hate, aversion) is the opposite of raga (lust, desire). Along with Raga and Moha, Dvesha is one of the three character afflictions that, in part, cause Dukkha. It is also one of the "threefold fires" in Buddhist Pali canon that must be quenched.
Dvesha is symbolically present as the snake in the center of Tibetan bhavachakra drawings. 
Dvesha (Pali: dosa) is identified in the following contexts within the Buddhist teachings:
 One of the three poisons (Trivisah) within the Mahayana Buddhist tradition.
 One of the three unwholesome roots within the Theravada Buddhist tradition
 One of the fourteen unwholesome mental factors within the Theravada Abhidharma teachings

Walpola Rahula renders it as "hatred", as does Chogyam Trungpa.

See also
 Advesha
 Kleshas (Buddhism)
 Mental factors (Buddhism)
 Taṇhā

References

Sources
 Bhikkhu Bodhi (2003), A Comprehensive Manual of Abhidhamma, Pariyatti Publishing
 Goleman, Daniel (2008). Destructive Emotions: A Scientific Dialogue with the Dalai Lama. Bantam. Kindle Edition.
 Geshe Tashi Tsering (2006). Buddhist Psychology: The Foundation of Buddhist Thought. Perseus Books Group. Kindle Edition.

Unwholesome factors in Buddhism
Sanskrit words and phrases